Lives may refer to:

 The plural form of a life
 Lives, Iran, a village in Khuzestan Province, Iran
 The number of lives in a video game
 Parallel Lives, aka Lives of the Noble Greeks and Romans, a series of biographies of famous men, written by Plutarch and thus often called Plutarch's Lives or The Lives of Plutarch
 LiVES, a video editing program and VJ tool
 "Lives", a song by Daron Malakian and Scars on Broadway from the album Dictator
 "Lives", a song by Modest Mouse from the album The Moon & Antarctica
 A short form of Lives of the Most Excellent Painters, Sculptors, and Architects, a 16th-century book by Giorgio Vasari
 'LIVES' - Lincolnshire Integrated Voluntary Emergency Service, Prehospital care provider in Lincolnshire, UK

See also
Live (disambiguation)
Life (disambiguation)
Living (disambiguation)